The balancing of incoming and outgoing water allows the Canal du Midi to operate as it does.  Each time a lock operates, large quantities of water are either required to fill it or dump from it into the lower level pound.  There must be a constant source of water in order to fill and the excess water dumped must have a place to exit the canal without it overflowing.  Being able to provide this water source was one of the most important problems to be solved by Pierre Paul Riquet, its creator.

In the canal's original configuration of 1687, water was provided by the Rigole de la plaine from the River Sor and from the Bassin de Saint-Ferréol.  The Bassin de Lampy was added later.  Since the drought of 1989-1990, water can also be made available from the Lac de Montbel.

Water leaving the canal between locks, will exit through either a weir or a  siphon.  Leaving through the weir, the water simply flows over the side of the canal via a stone or concrete ledge. If the water reaches a specific level, it may be siphoned off via a stone siphon.

See also
Aqueducts on the Canal du Midi
Canal du Midi
Locks on the Canal du Midi

Notes
 Distance in km from the beginning of the canal in Toulouse.

References

External links
CanalMidi.com
 The Canal du Midi - "Seuil de Naurouze"

Canal du Midi